Aquila chrysaetos simurgh is an extinct subspecies of the widespread golden eagle. Fossils are found in Crete; it was sometimes evaluated as a full species.

Ecology
It lived during the Pleistocene in Crete with Mammuthus creticus, the smallest mammoth known.

References

Pleistocene birds
Aquila (genus)
Prehistoric Crete
Late Quaternary prehistoric birds
Birds described in 1988